Oleksandr Volodymyrovych Danylyuk (born September 26, 1981) is Ukrainian public figure, lawyer, human rights activist. Coordinator of the public movement (now party) "Spilna Sprava" (Common Cause). Chief Advisor to the Minister of Defense of Ukraine Valeriy Heletey on a voluntary basis from July 15 to November 5, 2014.

Early life and education 
Born on September 26, 1981 in Kyiv, Ukraine. Mother is a doctor, a father is a scientist. Oleksandr Danyliuk graduated from the Kyiv National Economic University of Ukraine as Master of Laws(legal regulation of economy). Specialist of FDI attraction (USAID certificate).

Career 

2001–2003 - Lawyer Conflict resolution of Center for Conflictology and Law&.

2003–2006 - The National Bar Association Member.

2006–2010 - Executive Head of All-Ukrainian Center for Business Assistance.

2010 - Civil movement "Spilna Sprava" (Common Cause) Coordinator

2014 - Advisor to the Chief of the DSS (Department for State Security).

2014–2015 Ministry of defense of Ukraine. Chief Advisor to the Minister of Defense(de facto – Chief of Staff). Personal participation in military and special operations in Donbas, in particular, in the recapturing Slavyansk, Kramatorsk and protection of Mariupol.

From 2015: Centre for Defence Reforms, Chairman. Development of a number of reforms in the area of national security and defense, including:

 The concept of asymmetric response to Russian aggression;
 Reforming the structure of the Armed Forces;
 Creation of SOCCOM;
 Establishing a Joint Intelligence Committee;
 Creation of a Committee for economical warfare;
 The concept of information warfare;

Presidential candidate 2019 
Registered as a presidential candidate in Ukraine number 22. In the 2019 Ukrainian presidential election he won 0.02% of the votes.

Family 
Danyliuk is married and has two children.

References

External links 
 

1981 births
Politicians from Kyiv
Kyiv National Economic University alumni
Candidates in the 2019 Ukrainian presidential election
Living people